Emozioni (Emotions) is an album by the Italian singer-songwriter Lucio Battisti. It was released in December 1970 by Dischi Ricordi.

The album was Italy's fourth-best-selling album in 1971.

Track listing 
All lyrics written by Mogol; all music composed by Lucio Battisti.
 "Fiori rosa fiori di pesco" (Pink Flowers, Peach Flowers) − 3:14
 "Dolce di giorno" (Sweet by Day) − 2:39
 "Il tempo di morire" (The Time to Die) − 5:38
 "Mi ritorni in mente" (You come back to me) − 3:41
 "7 e 40" (7:40) − 3:32
 "Emozioni" (Emotions) − 4:47
 "Dieci ragazze" (Ten Girls) − 2:57
 "Acqua azzurra, acqua chiara" (Azure water, clear water) − 3:33
 "Era" (Was) − 2:57
 "Non è Francesca" (She is Not Francesca) − 3:56
 "Io vivrò (senza te)" (I Will Live (Without You)) − 3:54
 "Anna" (Anna) − 4:37

Certifications

References

1970 albums
Lucio Battisti albums
Italian-language albums
Albums produced by Lucio Battisti